Oliver Feltham is an Australian philosopher and translator working in Paris, France. He is known primarily for his English translations of Alain Badiou, most notably Badiou’s magnum opus Being and Event (2006). Feltham's own writings are drawn from many of his research interests including Marxism, critical theory, and the history of metaphysics. His recent work has also focused on psychoanalysis and Jacques Lacan.

Feltham received his B.A. at the University of Sydney. In 2000, he completed his doctoral thesis at Deakin University in Melbourne, writing his dissertation on the ontological distinction between praxis and work in ancient and modern philosophy (with a focus on Badiou and Michel Foucault) based on research Feltham conducted in Paris.

Feltham teaches at the American University of Paris (AUP) where he has been since 2004 and where he became a full-time associate professor in 2006, teaching in the comparative literature and "Global Communications" departments and in the Philosophy Program. Feltham is also a researcher at the Circle for Lacanian Ideology Critique at the Jan van Eyck Academie in Maastricht.

Selected bibliography
Translated books and articles
Alain Badiou:
 Infinite Thought: Truth and the Return to Philosophy, transl. and ed. by Feltham & Justin Clemens; (London: Continuum, 2003):  (paperback);  (hardcover)
 Being and Event, London: Continuum, 2006.
Jean-Claude Milner, "The Doctrine on Science", Umbr(a)L Science and Truth Issue (Buffalo: 2000).

Authored books
As Fire Burns: Of Ontology, Praxis, and Functional Work, Geelong, Deakin University PhD Thesis, 2000.
(ed. with Bruno Besana), Écrits autour de la pensée d'Alain Badiou, Paris, Éditions L'Harmattan, 2007.
Alain Badiou: Live Theory, London: Continuum, 2008. .
Anatomy of Failure: Philosophy and Political Action, London, Bloomsbury, 2013.

References

External links
 Faculty Homepage at The American University of Paris
Make it New: Oliver Feltham's Badiou: Live Theory a useful review & response "blog-post" to Feltham's work

Living people
Social philosophers
French–English translators
Marxist theorists
21st-century Australian philosophers
University of Sydney alumni
Deakin University alumni
Australian non-fiction writers
Australian translators
Academic staff of the American University of Paris
21st-century translators
Year of birth missing (living people)